John Nepomucene Neumann  (March 28, 1811 – January 5, 1860) was a Catholic immigrant from Bohemia. He came to the United States in 1836, where he was ordained, joined the Redemptorist order, and became the fourth Bishop of Philadelphia in 1852. In Philadelphia, Neumann founded the first Catholic diocesan school system in the US. Canonized in 1977, he is the only male US citizen to be named a saint.

Early life and education

Childhood

Neumann's father, Philip Neumann, a stocking knitter from Obernburg am Main, moved to Prachatitz in the Kingdom of Bohemia (then part of the Austrian Empire, now in the Czech Republic) in 1802 at age 28 with his wife, Antonie Strakotinská. Antonie died in November 1804, together with the child she bore. He married the daughter of a Czech harness maker, Agnes Lepší, on July 17, 1805, and Neumann was the third of their six children: Catherine, Veronica, John, Joan, Louise, and Wenceslaus (or Wenzel).

Neumann was born on March 28, 1811, and was baptized in the village church on the same day. He began his education in the town school when he was 6, and was a studious and hardworking child, whose mother called him "my little bibliomaniac" for his love of books and reading. Neumann spoke German at home and at school, and was only passably acquainted in his childhood with Czech.

At age 10, Neumann's parents told him they were prepared to allow him to continue his studies after grammar school, whereas most boys of that time would soon have to begin work. The catechist of Prachatitz helped prepare boys who hoped to pursue higher studies by offering them evening lessons in Latin at his home, which Neumann attended with eight or ten other boys for the last two years of his term at grammar school. In the autumn of 1823, Neumann passed the entrance examination with distinction for a school in Budweis which was operated by the Piarist Fathers.

Adolescence
Neumann entered the school in a class of 103 students, of whom less than fifty ultimately completed the six-year gymnasium course. The curriculum included Latin, mathematics, geography, history, and Christian doctrine in the first four years and was devoted to Latin and Greek classical authors in the last two years. Neumann was disappointed with the course's slow pace in his first years and thought he might easily have been able to advance to the third year, but this was not allowed. In the middle of the third year, Neumann's professor was dismissed for appearing before a public gathering while drunk and was replaced with a much stricter man who was resolved to make up for lost time and was very inclined to teaching by rote learning, a method Neumann disliked. The pace now became too fast for many students, and about twenty of Neumann's classmates dropped out, but he persevered and passed the examination that year with a fair average, as he had the two previous years.

Neumann's grades suffered in the fourth year while he was boarding in Budweis with a woman whose son disturbed him in his studies. Neumann's father, observing that he seemed to have lost interest in his studies, initially encouraged him to stay home and choose a trade. Still, his mother and his sister Veronica pressured him to persevere in his studies. His father's ideas changed upon having a professor who happened to be vacationing in Prachatitz examine his son and finding Neumann had made greater academic progress than his grades revealed. Upon moving to a new boarding house where he could enjoy greater solitude and quiet, Neumann's grades distinctly improved, except in his only weak subject, mathematics. Though the professor of classics was even stricter than the second mentor, Neumann found the study of the humanities very agreeable and achieved the highest grades of his career up to that time in his final term at the gymnasium. Neumann's hobbies at this time included playing the guitar and making images with a pantograph.

After completing the gymnasium course in 1829, Neumann began two years of study in philosophy in the same building but under different instructors, the Cistercian monks of Hohenfurth Abbey. The subjects taught at the Philosophical Institute included philosophy, religion, higher mathematics, the natural sciences, and Latin philology. Neumann attained a better than fair average in philosophy, philology, and mathematics, fully overcoming his earlier weakness in the latter. He excelled in botany and astronomy, forming a club with fellow students to discuss scientific subjects in their spare time.

Upon graduating from the philosophical course in the late summer of 1831, Neumann was faced with becoming a physician, a lawyer, or a priest. Finding himself with more of a taste for science and secular poetry than theology and the mystics, and discouraged by the difficulty of admission to the seminary, especially with no influential friends to recommend him, Neumann was initially inclined to study medicine, and his father was prepared to pay the tuition for medical school. His mother, however, sensing that his real desire was to be a priest, encouraged him to apply to the seminary even without testimonials from influential people, and to his surprise, he was accepted.

Seminary studies
Neumann entered the seminary of the Diocese of Budweis on November 1, 1831. Neumann's first two years studying theology were happy, stimulating days for him. Studying ecclesiastical history, Biblical archaeology, and introduction to and exegesis of the Old Testament in his first year, he received the highest possible grade, eminentem, in every subject, including diligence and conduct. At the end of his first year, he was one of the few men in his class permitted to take tonsure and minor orders. In his second year at Budweis, Neumann studied Biblical hermeneutics, philology, Greek, pedagogy, introduction to and exegesis of the New Testament, and canon law. His grades were again very good, receiving the highest grade in every subject except in one semester when he received the second-highest possible grade in pedagogy. In his spare time, he began to study French and worked to improve his command of Italian, which he had started to learn during his philosophy course, and of Czech.

In his second year studying theology, Neumann began to read the reports of the Leopoldine Society on the need for priests in the United States, especially to serve the German-speaking communities there. Inspired by a dramatic lecture given by the seminary director on the missionary activities of Paul the Apostle, Neumann and his friend Adalbert Schmidt both made up their minds to devote their lives to the missions after completing their seminary studies. Neither said a word to the other until Schmidt revealed his plan a few weeks later to Neumann, who teased his friend for the whole month before finally admitting, "I am going with you."

Neumann's intention to go to America made it necessary to learn English, but there was no opportunity to do so in Budweis. The Bishop of Budweis had the privilege of sending two of his seminarians each year to study at the archiepiscopal seminary connected with the University of Prague. In the spring of 1833, Neumann successfully petitioned the bishop to continue his study of theology there, where he hoped to learn French and, more importantly, English. There is some indication that Neumann began to attend the university's lectures in French, but this became impossible when the state imposed new regulations in 1834 forbidding seminarians to go out for walks except for four hours a week, two on Tuesday afternoon and two on Thursday. Nevertheless, Neumann continued to study French independently and presented himself for the examination, managing to pass with a very high grade despite not attending all of the lectures. Neumann was disappointed that the university did not offer classes in English but studied independently from a book and by engaging in conversation with some English workmen at a nearby factory. After a year, he was capable of writing portions of his diary in English.

Neumann found the lectures in Prague disagreeable because of the Febronian views of his professors, which Neumann regarded as heterodox. The lector in dogmatic theology, Jerome Zeidler, denied papal infallibility, which Neumann supported in a treatise he sent on the question to an inquiring friend in Budweis, though there is no evidence Neumann openly opposed Zeidler in class. Neumann said of Zeidler that he enjoyed too little reputation with the students to do them much harm. Neumann privately studied the Roman Catechism, the works of Robert Bellarmine and Peter Canisius, and the works of the Church Fathers, especially Augustine of Hippo and Gregory the Great. Neumann's grades at the end of the 1833–1834 academic year were once again very high, though not as high as at Budweis. In his final year at Prague, Neumann studied pastoral theology, homiletics, pedagogy, and catechetics. His grades, while good, were the lowest of his four years studying theology. By this time, Neumann was able to use German, Czech, French, English, Spanish, and Italian, as well as Latin and Greek.

Journey to America
Adalbert Schmidt, who was continuing his studies in Budweis and still planned to go with Neumann to America as a missionary, told his confessor, Hermann Dichtl, of this intention. Dichtl encouraged this plan and thought to send Neumann to the Diocese of Philadelphia in response to Coadjutor Bishop Francis Kenrick's call for two German priests, which Dichtl had learned of through his correspondence with Andreas Räss, the director of a seminary in Strasbourg. However, correspondence between Europe and America was slow, and no definite response regarding Neumann was received from Philadelphia.

Neumann expected to be ordained to the priesthood by Bishop Ernest Růžička at the end of the academic year in 1835, but on June 10, Růžička became seriously ill. Although Neumann returned to Budweis for his canonical examination for the priesthood and very successfully passed, the ordinations delayed by the bishop's illness were ultimately canceled because the Diocese of Budweis had more priests than it needed, with some priests ordained the previous year still lacking assignments. It was a blow to Neumann that he would not be ordained before leaving for America, as he would not be able to give the traditional first priestly blessing to his parents, nor have his family present at his first Mass.

Neumann's family were shocked and saddened when he returned home and informed them of his intention to become a missionary, and his sisters broke down and cried. In his diary, Neumann wrote that the bishop and canons of the diocese "more or less approved" of his plans to go to America. Dichtl still intended to send both Schmidt and Neumann to Philadelphia, but as the money raised for the trip was barely enough to cover the expenses of one, and the Leopoldine Society was unwilling to provide financial support for the journey without a direct and definite call from the Bishop of Philadelphia, Neumann resolved to go alone. Neumann departed for America on the morning of February 8, 1836, without telling anyone except his sister Veronica that he was leaving Bohemia; his mother thought he was leaving only for another of his journeys to Budweis.

Neumann went to see Bishop Růžička, who gave his blessing for the trip, but did not provide the dimissorial letters Neumann desired. Perplexed by the proceedings but confident that the matter would be straightened out in due course, Neumann departed with 200 francs (about $40) in his purse. Schmidt, who had now decided to remain in Budweis as a diocesan priest, accompanied Neumann as far as Einsiedeln. Neumann arrived on February 16 in Linz, where he was hospitably received and given a letter of introduction by Bishop Gregory Ziegler, and departed on the evening of February 18 for Munich.

In Munich, however, Neumann was introduced to John Henni, who told him that a German priest was no longer needed in Philadelphia. Henni reassured him that there was a great need for German priests in such dioceses as Detroit, New York, and Vincennes, but advised him that it would be better to remain in Europe than to leave without dimissorial letters. The next morning, a professor at the University of Munich advised Neumann to get in touch with Bishop Simon Bruté of Vincennes, who was then in Europe recruiting missionaries for his diocese. Henni provided Neumann with Bishop Bruté's address in Paris, where a letter could be expected to reach him by the time he returned there around Easter.

Neumann arrived in Strasbourg at midnight, February 26, where Canon Räss confirmed his no longer being needed in Philadelphia. Räss also revealed that he had no money to give Neumann, who did not have enough for the journey overseas, as the money that had been intended for Neumann had been given to some other missionaries from Alsace-Lorraine. However, Räss promised to introduce Neumann to a rich merchant in Paris who was greatly interested in missionaries and would undoubtedly give him a considerable sum and to write to Bishop John Dubois of New York urging him to accept the young Bohemian cleric. Neumann could not quite understand the attitude of Räss, who seemed cold and stiff, but he did make Neumann a present of many books. Neumann went on from Strasbourg to Nancy, where he spent four days with the Sisters of St. Charles, some of whom had been brought by Dichtl as novices from Bohemia so that they could return to found a house there, before continuing to Paris by way of Châlons-en-Champagne and Meaux. Another missionary bound for the United States, a priest surnamed Schaefer, was with him on the trip.

Neumann stayed for a whole month in Paris, buying books and seeing the sights. On the Fourth Sunday of Lent, he was able to hear Henri-Dominique Lacordaire preach at Notre-Dame de Paris. Neumann also visited the Panthéon, Montmartre, and the Louvre. Two weeks after Neumann and Schaefer had arrived in Paris, Schaefer received a letter from Bishop Bruté informing him that he would be accepted. Still, three other missionaries who had applied for a place in the Diocese of Vincennes were rejected. Nothing was said of Neumann, whose letter to Bruté had gone astray. Neumann stayed longer, hoping to receive other news or meet Bruté personally when he came to Paris. Still, as the weeks went on, Neumann was uneasy, as his finances were very strained, and the money Räss had promised from the rich merchant did not materialize. Finally, Neumann decided to wait no longer and sail to America since he was confident German-speaking missionaries would be needed there. If he could not find acceptance in New York, he would seek an assignment in Vincennes, Detroit, or St. Louis, and if these efforts failed, he would return to New York and wait there until his services were required.

On Easter Tuesday, Neumann left Paris and arrived in Le Havre shortly after noon, April 7, 1836. It was the first time in his life that he had seen the ocean. Neumann chose to sail on the largest vessel sailing out of Le Havre, a 210-foot three-master with a sixty-foot beam named the Europa, because it seemed less crowded with passengers than other ships. It took Neumann four days to get aboard, which he spent praying in the parish church, reading Francis de Sales' Introduction to the Devout Life, and practicing his English and French with the locals. The voyage lasted forty days. Neumann was seasick for three days but felt better afterward. For three more days, the ship was becalmed and made no progress; when the boat came within sight of icebergs off the banks of Newfoundland, Neumann was chilled by the thought of what might happen if the ship should crash into one of them.

Priesthood

Arrival and ordination

The passengers came within sight of land on May 28, 1836, which was the eve of Trinity Sunday. The ship remained outside New York Harbor for another three days waiting for bad weather to abate and for some sick people aboard to recover lest quarantine officials require the captain to transport them back to Europe. Neumann, anxious to get ashore, was refused permission to disembark by the captain six times before he was finally let off in a rowboat on which he went to Staten Island. Several hours later, he took the small steamer Hercules to lower Manhattan. An hour before noon on the feast of Corpus Christi, Neumann stepped ashore with one tattered suit of clothes and one dollar in his pocket. Neumann immediately sought out a Catholic church, and a Swiss innkeeper directed him to one where the pastor, Joseph A. Schneller, gave him the address of Bishop Dubois and John Raffeiner, the vicar-general of the Germans in New York, to whom Neumann went straightaway.

Neumann was glad to learn from  Raffeiner that a note had been sent to Canon Räss three weeks before saying he had been accepted as a priest for the Diocese of New York. Together, they went to the home of Bishop Dubois, who was urgently in need of German pastors. Dubois greeted Neumann and, having sufficient guarantees of Neumann's education in Europe, told him to immediately prepare for ordination. Neumann asked for some time for immediate preparation, which the bishop granted, as he was set to leave for a visitation. When Neumann told the bishop that he had no dimissorial letters, Dubois swept that difficulty aside, saying, "I can and must ordain you quickly for I need you." Raffeiner took Neumann to his parish, St. Nicholas Kirche, and put him to work teaching catechism to the children preparing for their First Communion.

Dubois called Neumann for ordination seventeen days after his arrival, ordaining him at St. Patrick's Old Cathedral to the subdiaconate on June 19, the diaconate on Friday, June 24, and the priesthood on June 25. Neumann celebrated his first Mass the next morning, Sunday, June 26, at St. Nicholas. "Oh Jesus, You poured out the fullness of your grace over me yesterday. You made me a priest and gave me the power to offer You up to God. Ah! God! This is too much for my soul! Angels of God, all you saints of heaven, come down and adore my Jesus because what my heart says is only the imperfect echo of what Holy Church tells me to say." He resolved, "I will pray to You that You may give to me holiness, and to all the living and the dead, pardon, that someday we may all be together with You, our dearest God!"

Diocesan priest in New York

The Diocese of New York at that time encompassed all of the State of New York and the upper third of New Jersey. The diocese at that time was home to 200,000 Catholics whose numbers were rapidly being swelled by immigrants, for whom sufficient churches and priests were lacking. The diocese had thirty-three churches and several oratories, while fifty private homes served as temporary places of worship for lack of more suitable buildings. The diocese had thirty-six priests, of whom thirty-one were Irish and only three German, and needed at least fifteen priests more. Dubois, who Räss had informed that Neumann and his friends Adalbert Schmidt and John Savel all wanted to go to the American missions, was disappointed when only one man arrived. Still, his German parishes were growing quickly, and one was better than nothing.

The Catholic hierarchy had been established in the United States only five decades earlier with the appointment of John Carroll as prefect-apostolic and then Bishop of Baltimore, and until 1908, all of the United States was still regarded in the Catholic Church as mission territory under the jurisdiction of the Congregation for the Propagation of the Faith (or Propaganda). There were no parishes in the strict sense, and in his own writings, Neumann always observed correct technical usage in referring to a portion of a diocese as a "mission," "congregation," or "quasi-parish." However, places where he worked are often described by more recent writers as parishes.

After his ordination, Dubois assigned Neumann to assist Alexander Pax in serving recent German immigrants in the Buffalo area. The more senior priest there, John Nicholas Mertz, was in Europe raising funds. Neumann departed on a Hudson River liner with new clothes given to him by Raffeiner and the bishop's funds for his travel expenses on June 28. Dubois wished Neumann to stop at Rochester before continuing to Buffalo. The German Catholics in Rochester were then holding services in the basement of St. Patrick's Church under the direction of Bernard O'Reilly. Still, as most of the Catholics in that area were Irish, they raised funds to build a separate church where they could be served in their native language.

The German Catholics in Rochester were delighted by a German-speaking priest's arrival, and some planned to write to Bishop Dubois asking him to assign Neumann there permanently. Neumann began to teach the children, whom he found sadly neglected and unable to speak either German or English correctly and celebrate the sacraments. After administering his first baptism, he wrote in his journal, "If the child I baptized today dies in the grace of this sacrament, then my journey to America has been repaid a million times, even though I do nothing for the rest of my life." On the evening of Neumann's first Sunday in Rochester, he was relieved by the German Redemptorist Joseph Prost's arrival. The encounter with Prost first excited a desire in him to join the Congregation of the Most Holy Redeemer himself, although it was then only a passing thought. Neumann continued on to Buffalo on July 11.

The missions in Buffalo were headquartered at a small church established by Mertz in 1829 known as the Church of the Lamb of God. There were four unfinished churches in the surrounding area at North Bush (the present-day parish of St. John the Baptist, now part of Tonawanda) eight miles to the north, at Williamsville eight miles to the northeast (now the parish of Ss. Peter and Paul), at Cayuga Creek, and thirty miles to the south at Eden. Pax was so grateful to have another priest to assist him in caring for the extensive territory that he offered Neumann any share of the work he desired, whether he preferred to work in the city where many of the faithful were concentrated or in the rural areas where Catholics were more dispersed. Neumann chose to station himself at Williamsville, from which he cared for an area of some twelve to fifteen miles around it where four hundred Catholic families lived, of whom three hundred were German. Because no pastoral residence had been constructed, Neumann took a room in the home of a wealthy benefactor of the mission, Jacob Philip Wirtz.

The partially built church at Williamsville had been founded on land that had been donated to the Catholics on the condition that they would build a stone church, 115 feet long, thirty feet high, and twenty feet wide, a stipulation that was difficult to fulfill because the Catholics in the area were largely poor immigrants who were capable of giving little to the church. Mertz had been able to collect or borrow enough money, stone, and volunteer labor to erect four walls, but that was as far as construction had progressed. While Neumann said Mass for the first time in the roofless structure, some non-Catholics from the area threw stones into the church, one of which landed on the altar. Neumann completed this structure, inducing Wirtz to remit a loan he had made of $400 on the condition that a memorial Mass be said for him every year after his death.

A little school was conducted in a neighboring house by a lay teacher appointed by Mertz. Still, Neumann, finding the man's conduct unsatisfactory, dismissed him and took up the task of teaching himself, two hours in the morning and two hours in the afternoon, until securing the services of another teacher seven months later. Neumann was a gifted teacher, and his students fondly remembered his stories in catechism class years later. He would often reward good students with small gifts, and when teaching the children to sing in the liturgy, he would induce those who complained of sore throats to return to singing with rock candy, of which he seemed to have an inexhaustible supply. Neumann again had a school after moving his headquarters to North Bush in 1837 and was erecting a third schoolhouse at Lancaster by December 1839.

Although Neumann's principal missions were Williamsville, Lancaster, and North Bush, he was soon caring for Transit, Sheldon, Batavia, Pendleton, and Tonawanda. For over four years, he was always on the move, traveling on foot often over swampy ground, from station to station, from house to house, in the biting cold of winter and the heat of summer, visiting the sick, aiding the dying, baptizing the newborn, instilling faith and zeal into the backsliders. In the three main churches under his care, the baptisms averaged sixty-five a year and the marriages eight. Still, Neumann's workload was heavy, particularly in virtue of the considerable distances to be traversed on foot, with a heavy pack on his back containing his vestments. The nearest out-mission was two hours away, the furthest twelve hours, and it was necessary to return home to North Bush almost every night, as there were no accommodations at the outposts, and besides, Neumann needed to be at home to teach every day.

The figure of the short-statured man of God was familiar to all the countryside. Out of pity for his exhausting labors, they soon induced him to take a horse. People laughed at the clumsy way Neumann rode; because he was only , his feet did not reach the stirrups. Once, Neumann found himself thrown off the horse's back. On several other occasions when the horse wanted to rid himself of his rider, the animal made for the nearby fences and brushed Neumann's legs against them so that the cleric fell ignominiously to the ground. After that, Neumann led the horse along by the bridle instead of riding until he learned to control the stubborn creature. But Neumann did learn to ride, not in the manner of an expert but as a fair horseman. He and his horse eventually became great friends, even though on one occasion the voracious animal ate a precious quantity of botanical specimens the missionary had collected to send home to Bohemia.

Here, Neumann had his first difficulties with lay trusteeism. In many American Catholic congregations, the title to the church property was placed in the hands of lay members who formed a majority of the parish corporation and often sought to act independently of the pastor and contrary to the traditional administration of parish concerns. It took the ecclesiastical hierarchy many years to eradicate the disturbances caused by this system. In Neumann's day, the trustees were the important people in a parish, and it was vitally important for a pastor to get along well with them. Neumann refrained from open arguments with contentious trustees, and no matter what they said, he would smile and say nothing, which more than one trustee regarded as disrespectful. One of these resentful trustees once spread gossip concerning the propriety of Neumann's lodging in the home of Wirtz, which was over a tavern and in a room that could only be entered by going through the room of a young servant girl. One day, Neumann was called down to a meeting of the trustees in the tavern below Wirtz's house and informed that the meeting's purpose was to decide whether Wirtz should be obliged to dismiss the servant girl. Neumann, astounded though he was, responded with only a wry smile and a quiet disavowal. The trustees were convinced the bashful and holy priest was entirely innocent and blamed the jealous neighbor who wanted Neumann to lodge with his family instead of Wirtz's. Soon the man lost prestige in the neighborhood. Nevertheless, the danger of such gossip was not lost on Neumann, and he quietly changed his residence in 1837 to North Bush, though the church was not nearly so good as the one in Williamsville. He accepted free lodgings from a friendly Catholic, John Schmidt, who lived a mile and a half from the church, which Neumann had to walk every morning over an almost impassable road to say his daily Mass.

The move from Williamsville to North Bush came when the entire region was sunk in the direst poverty by the depression that followed upon the Panic of 1837. Many of the area's Catholics were without work and often without food and could give little or nothing to support the church. Neumann wrote to a fellow priest in Europe, "If you want to be a missionary, you have to love poverty and be entirely disinterested." Though he found himself $80 in debt at the end of the first year, he was satisfied that thanks to the people's gifts of corn and potatoes; he did not starve. Shortly after the move to North Bush, Bishop Dubois arrived on a visitation tour of the district. He expressed his pleasure upon seeing the more advanced stage of the buildings, the schools, the careful attention to the sick and the dying, and the weekly, even daily rounds made by the young pastor.

In North Bush, the people got together and bought five acres of land close to the church on which Neumann could build a house and grow some vegetables for his support. Neumann worked at times on this and other buildings with his own hands and rejoiced when he moved into the two-room log cabin. After Neumann had his own house, he cooked his meals, and often he missed meals; observers noticed smoke rarely rose from Neumann's chimney, meaning the stove was not being used. Once, he lived only on bread for four weeks. People also noticed that when he visited the homes of the faithful, he never asked for a meal. Although Neumann's efforts to recruit additional priests from Europe were unsuccessful, in September 1839, Neumann's brother Wenzel came from Bohemia to assist him, taking over the cooking and teaching in the school, as well as helping with the construction of the churches, schoolhouses, and rectories. Wenzel brought Neumann the first news he'd had of his family in three years, for no letter of theirs had reached him since he left Europe. Neumann loved his family intensely, and Wenzel's coming to help him was a godsend.

Neumann began to experience spiritual aridity and feared his love for God was growing less fervent. Neumann saw pride in himself though everyone else said he was humble and thought he was slothful. Still, people around Buffalo said long after that he burned himself out making the rounds of his parish. After Neumann discussed his spiritual difficulties with Prost, Prost wrote to him that living alone is difficult, quoting Ecclesiastes, "woe to him who is alone!" Neumann often revolved that thought in his mind, especially in the summer of 1840 when his health broke down completely, and he was unable to do any pastoral work for three months. Neumann declared that he had an intense longing for the company of other priests. Frequent consultations with his confessor, Pax, followed, and after a long time, Pax advised Neumann that it was his vocation to become a religious.

On September 4, 1840, Neumann wrote to Prost, the Redemptorists' superior in America, asking for admission to the Congregation of the Most Holy Redeemer. Receiving a favorable reply from Prost on September 16, Neumann immediately wrote to Bishop John Hughes, acquainting him with his desire to enter the Redemptorists and asking him to send one or more priests to take over the churches outside Buffalo. Unbeknownst to Neumann, the bishop was on visitation, so no reply was forthcoming. Still, leaving the negotiations with Hughes in Pax and Prost's hands as they advised, Neumann left the Buffalo area on October 8 or 9, 1840. When Hughes learned of the matter, he was not at all inclined to allow a pastor of Neumann's caliber to depart from his diocese, but Prost later wrote, "I appealed to canon law and pointed out that I could not refuse to accept him, even if I wished to. The Most Reverend Bishop was obliged to yield." His brother, Wenzel, stayed to gather up the few belongings that Neumann possessed in the various mission stations and resolved to follow his brother and become a lay brother of the Congregation of the Most Holy Redeemer.

Redemptorist novitiate

The Congregation of the Most Holy Redeemer, popularly known as the Redemptorists, had been founded in Naples in 1732 by Alphonsus Liguori, and had grown only slowly during its founder's lifetime. Clement Hofbauer established the Congregation north of the Alps. Joseph Passerat, who ran the Congregation from 1820 to 1848 dispatched the first Redemptorist missionaries to America in 1832. They had secured their first foundation in Pittsburgh in April 1839, taking over St. Philomena's Church. When Neumann joined them, they had four foundations: St. Philomena's in Pittsburgh, St. John's in Baltimore, St. Joseph's in Rochester, and St. Alphonsus' in Norwalk, Ohio.

Neumann arrived in Pittsburgh and presented himself to the Redemptorists on the morning of Sunday, October 18, 1840, where he was invited on the first day to sing the High Mass and preach, which he did despite the fatigue of his long journey from Buffalo. The matter of dimissorial letters having been straightened out with Bishop Hughes, Prost hurried to Pittsburgh to invest Neumann with the Redemptorist habit. As this was the first investiture of a Redemptorist in the New World, the Fathers wished to make it a solemn occasion. Unfortunately, they lacked the ritual of the prescribed ceremonies and prayers, as their only copies of these had been destroyed in a fire in New York. Drawing on their memories of their investitures, they devised a suitable ceremony and proceeded to clothe him in the Redemptorist habit.

He took his religious vows as a member of the congregation in Baltimore, in January 1842. While a novice for the Redemptorists, he served at St. Alphonsus Church in Peru Township, Huron County, Ohio for five months before returning to New York. He was naturalized as a United States citizen in Baltimore on February 10, 1848. He served as the pastor of St. Augustine Church in Elkridge, Maryland, from 1849 to 1851.

Redemptorist superior

After six years of difficult but fruitful work in Maryland, Neumann became the Provincial Superior for the United States. He also served as parish priest at St. Alphonsus Church in Baltimore.

Bishop of Philadelphia

On February 5, 1852, the Holy See appointed Neumann Bishop of Philadelphia. His predecessor in that office, Francis Kenrick (who had become Archbishop of Baltimore), presided over the consecration on March 28, and Bishop Bernard O'Reilly assisted. The consecration was held in St. Alphonsus Church, Baltimore. 

Philadelphia had a large and expanding Catholic immigrant population; Germans who fled the Napoleonic and other Continental wars had been followed by Irish fleeing the Great Famine caused by the potato blight and wars. Soon Italians and other southern and eastern European Catholics would arrive. Some settled in the diocese's rural parts, similar to the rural areas of New York state where Neumann had begun his ministry, but many stayed in the city. At the time, Philadelphia was one of the largest cities in the country.  

It was an industrializing mercantile hub with many jobs for people with little command of the English language. The waves of immigration resulted in tensions in the city with native-born residents, who had to compete for work in difficult economic times. Anti-Catholic riots took place in the 1830s and 1844, in the Philadelphia Nativist Riots, occurring as Irish Catholics began to arrive in significant numbers in the city. Soon more riots occurred, mainly since the town was a stronghold of the Know-Nothing political party, known for its anti-immigrant and anti-Catholic prejudices.

During Neumann's administration, new parish churches were completed at the rate of nearly one per month. To encourage savings and to support the financial needs of the Catholic community in Philadelphia, he directed the creation of a mutual savings bank, Beneficial Bank, in 1853. As many immigrants settled in close communities from their hometowns and with speakers of the same language, churches became associated with immigrants from particular regions. They were known as national parishes. Their parishioners often did not speak English or know how to obtain needed social services.

Neumann was particularly committed to providing educational opportunities to immigrant children. He became the first bishop to organize a diocesan school system, as Catholic parents wanted their children taught in the Catholic tradition. They feared Protestant influence and discrimination in public schools. 
Under his administration, the number of parochial schools in his diocese increased from one to 200. His 1852 catechisms became standard texts. 

Neumann's fluency in several languages endeared him to the many new immigrant communities in Philadelphia. As well as ministering to newcomers in his native German, Neumann also spoke Italian fluently. A growing congregation of Italian-speakers received pastoral care in his private chapel, and Neumann eventually established in Philadelphia the first Italian national parishes in the country.

Neumann actively invited religious institutes to establish new houses within the diocese to provide necessary social services. In 1855, Neumann supported the foundation of a congregation of religious sisters in the city, the Sisters of St. Francis of Philadelphia. He brought the School Sisters of Notre Dame from Germany to assist in religious instruction and staff an orphanage. He also intervened to save the Oblate Sisters of Providence from dissolution; this congregation of African-American women was founded by Haitian refugees in Baltimore.

The large diocese was not wealthy, and Neumann became known for his personal frugality. He kept and wore only one pair of boots throughout his residence in the United States. When given a new set of vestments as a gift, he would often use them to outfit the newest ordained priest in the diocese. Discouraged by conflict as well as anti-Catholic riots and arson of religious buildings, Neumann wrote to Rome asking to be replaced as bishop, but Pope Pius IX insisted that he continue.

Trip to Rome and Bohemia

In 1854, Neumann traveled to Rome and was present at St. Peter's Basilica on December 8, when Pius IX solemnly defined, ex cathedra, the dogma of the Immaculate Conception of the Blessed Virgin Mary. He visited Prachatice for a week from February 3 1855. Although he wanted this to be done quietly the citizens greeted him lavishly on arrival. The visit is noted next to his baptismal record in the parish register alongside a later pencil note about his canonisation in 1977.

Death

While doing errands on Thursday, January 5, 1860, Neumann collapsed and died on a Philadelphia street. He was 48 years old. He was buried, per his request, at St. Peter's Church beneath the undercroft floor directly below the high altar. 

Bishop James Frederick Wood, a Philadelphia native who converted to Catholicism in Cincinnati in 1836 and who had been appointed Neumann's coadjutor with right of succession in 1857, succeeded Neumann as Bishop of Philadelphia.

Veneration

Neumann was declared venerable by Pope Benedict XV in 1921. He was beatified by Pope Paul VI during the Second Vatican Council on October 13, 1963, and was canonized by that same pope on June 19, 1977. His feast days are January 5, the date of his death, on the Roman calendar for the church in the United States of America, and June 19 in the Czech Republic.

After his canonization, the National Shrine of Saint John Neumann was constructed at the Parish of St. Peter the Apostle, at 5th Street and Girard Avenue in Philadelphia. The remains of John Neumann rest under the altar of the shrine within a glass-walled reliquary.

Legacy
In 1980, Our Lady of the Angels College, founded by the congregation of Franciscan Sisters he had founded and located within the archdiocese, was renamed Neumann College. It was granted university status by the Commonwealth of Pennsylvania in 2009.

The St. John Neumann Education Trust was established in 2017 in the Diocese of Manchester, New Hampshire for the advancement of Catholic education in the state of New Hampshire.

A street is named after him in his hometown of Prachatice.

Jubilee year
In 2011, the Redemptorist Fathers celebrated the 200th anniversary of the birth of Neumann. The Closing Mass for the Neumann Year was held on June 23, 2012, in Philadelphia.

Schools named for Neumann
 St. John Neumann Academy (Blacksburg, Virginia)
St. John Neumann Catholic School, Maryville, IL
 Neumann Preparatory School (Wayne, New Jersey)
 Bishop Neumann Catholic High School in Wahoo, Nebraska 
 Neumann Classical School
 Saint John Neumann High School (Pennsylvania)
 St. John Neumann High School (Naples, Florida)
 Neumann University
 Biskupské gymnázium Jana Nepomuka Neumanna (Budweis - Czech Republic)
 Saint John Neumann Catholic School (Knoxville, Tennessee)
 Saint John Neumann Catholic School (Pueblo, Colorado)
 Saint John Neumann Regional Academy (Williamsport, Pennsylvania)
 St. John Neumann Regional Catholic School (Lilburn, Georgia)
Bishop Neumann High School (Williamsville, New York- Renamed Ss. Peter and Paul School)
St. John Neumann (Columbia, SC)
Grades 3K-6th

See also
 Saint John Neumann, patron saint archive
 Demetrius Augustine Gallitzin, Apostle of the Alleghenies

References

Sources

External links
 "Homily preached by Pope Paul VI at the canonization of Saint John Neumann", 1977, Vatican website
 History Making Production's video, “Urban Trinity: The Story of Catholic Philadelphia”

1811 births
1860 deaths
Canonizations by Pope Paul VI
19th-century Christian saints
19th-century Roman Catholic bishops in the United States
American Roman Catholic saints
Austrian people of German Bohemian descent
Austrian Roman Catholic missionaries
Catholics from Maryland
Charles University alumni
Czech Roman Catholic saints
Founders of Catholic religious communities
German Bohemian people
Austrian Empire emigrants to the United States
Incorrupt saints
People from Elkridge, Maryland
People from Prachatice
People of the Roman Catholic Archdiocese of New York
Redemptorists
Redemptorist bishops
Redemptorist saints
Religious leaders from Baltimore
Roman Catholic bishops of Philadelphia
Roman Catholic missionaries in the United States